The Friend of History Award is an award given by the Organization of American Historians (OAH). The award was first presented in 2005. It is not a monetary award and is granted annually.

Purpose
Friend of History Award "recognizes an individual, who is not a professional historian, or an institution or organization for outstanding support for the pursuit of historical research, for the public presentation of history, or for the work of the OAH."

Recipients
Source: Organization of American Historians

2005: Seymour G. Sternberg, New York Life Insurance Company 
2005: Gilder Lehrman Institute of American History
2006: Geoffrey C. Ward, Independent Scholar
2007: Senator Robert C. Byrd
2007: Libby O'Connell and The History Channel
2008: Ruth J. Simmons, president, Brown University
2009: Brian P. Lamb, founder and CEO, C-SPAN, host of Booknotes
2010: Newberry Library
2011: Jay S. Goodgold, Independent Investor
2012: No award given
2013: The almost 85,000 participants in the U.S. Department of Education's Teaching American History Program
2014: Stephen A. Briganti, president and chief executive officer, Statue of Liberty-Ellis Island Foundation
2015: Colin G. Campbell, chairman emeritus, Colonial Williamsburg Foundation
2016: NASA Johnson Space Center History Office
2017: Lonnie G. Bunch III, National Museum of African American History and Culture
2018: Civil War Trust
2019: Natasha Trethewey, Northwestern University
2020: Ulysses S. Grant Association

See also

 List of history awards

References

History awards
American awards
Awards established in 2005